Glasthule is a suburb of Dublin, Ireland. It is along County Dublin’s south coast, between Dún Laoghaire and Dalkey.

Amenities
Sandycove and Glasthule are served by a number of businesses and amenities, including retail outlets, public houses, a post office, restaurants, cafés and a playschool.

The Presentation Brothers maintain a house in Glasthule and ran Presentation College Glasthule, a secondary school for boys, until 2006. The Harold National School, next door to Presentation Brothers still operates today.

An Aircoach service links the area with Dublin Airport 24 hours a day.

Popular culture
Every year on 16 June it celebrates Bloomsday (the day on which James Joyce's novel Ulysses takes place). The James Joyce Tower is located in nearby Sandycove.

It is the main setting for Jamie O'Neill's 2001 novel At Swim, Two Boys.

See also
 List of towns and villages in Ireland
 Sandycove and Glasthule railway station

Places in Dún Laoghaire–Rathdown